Julian Miles Holland,  (born 24 January 1958) is an English pianist, bandleader, singer, composer and television presenter. He was an original member of the band Squeeze and has worked with many artists including Jayne County, Sting, Eric Clapton, Mark Knopfler, George Harrison, David Gilmour, Magazine, The The, Ringo Starr and Bono.

From 1982 until 1987, he co-presented the Channel 4 music programme The Tube. Since 1992, he has hosted Later... with Jools Holland, a music-based show aired on BBC2, on which his annual show Hootenanny is based. Holland is a published author and appears on television shows besides his own and contributes to radio shows. In 2004 he collaborated with Tom Jones on an album of traditional R&B music.

On BBC Radio 2 Holland also regularly hosts the weekly programme Jools Holland, a mix of live and recorded music and general chat and features studio guests, along with members of his orchestra.

Early life and education
Holland was born on 24 January 1958 in Blackheath, South East London. At the age of eight, he could play the piano fluently by ear. By his early teens he was appearing regularly in many of the pubs in South East London and the East End Docks.

Holland was educated at Shooters Hill Grammar School in southeast London, from which he was expelled for damaging a teacher's Triumph Herald.

Career
Holland began his career as a session musician. His first studio session was with Wayne County & the Electric Chairs in 1976 on their track "Fuck Off".

Holland was a founding member of the British pop band Squeeze, formed in March 1974, in which he played keyboards until 1980, through its first three albums, the eponymous Squeeze, Cool for Cats and Argybargy, before pursuing his solo career.

Holland began issuing solo records in 1978, his first EP being Boogie Woogie '78. He continued his solo career through the early 1980s, releasing an album and several singles between 1981 and 1984. He branched out into TV, co-presenting the Newcastle-based TV music show The Tube with Paula Yates. Holland used the phrase, "be there, or be an ungroovy fucker" in one early evening TV trailer for the show, live across two channels, causing him to be suspended from the show for six weeks. He referred to this in his sitcom The Groovy Fellers with Rowland Rivron.  Holland also appeared as a guest host on MTV.

In 1983, Holland played an extended piano solo on The The's re-recording of "Uncertain Smile" for the album Soul Mining. In 1985, Squeeze (which had continued in Holland's absence through to 1982) unexpectedly regrouped including Holland as their keyboard player. Holland remained in the band until 1990, at which point he again departed to resume his solo career as a musician and a TV host.

In 1987, Holland formed the Jools Holland Big Band, which consisted of himself and for the show Gilson Lavis from Squeeze, which gradually grew and was renamed as Jools Holland's Rhythm and Blues Orchestra. In May 2022, it was a 17-piece orchestra and included singers Louise Marshall, Ruby Turner and Holland's daughter Mabel Ray, as well as his younger brother, singer-songwriter and keyboard player, Christopher Holland.

Between 1988 and 1990 Holland performed and co-hosted along with David Sanborn during the two seasons of the music performance programme Sunday Night on NBC late-night television. Since 1992, he has presented the music programme Later... with Jools Holland, plus an annual New Year's Eve Hootenanny.

In 1996, Holland signed a recording contract with Warner Bros. Records, and his records are now marketed through Rhino Records.

On 29 November 2002, Holland was in the ensemble of musicians who performed at the Concert for George, which celebrated the music of George Harrison. In January 2005 Holland and his band performed with Eric Clapton as the headline act of the Tsunami Relief Cardiff.

In March 2023, Jimmy Barnes announced the formation of supergroup The Barnestormers, featuring Barnes, Chris Cheney, Slim Jim Phantom, Jools Holland and Kevin Shirley. A self-titled album is set for release on 26 May 2023.

Personal life
As a teenager, Holland lived with his grandparents, which he mentioned anecdotally in a 2020 episode of Rhod Gilbert's Growing Pains.

Holland has a son, George, and daughter, Rose, with his former partner Mary Leahy. On 30 August 2005, Holland married Christabel McEwen, his girlfriend of 15 years and daughter of artist Rory McEwen. The couple have a daughter, Mabel, and McEwen has a son, Frederick Lambton, Viscount Lambton, by her former marriage to Ned Lambton, the 7th Earl of Durham.

Holland lives in Westcombe Park, south east London, where he had his studio, Helicon Mountain, built to his design and inspired by Portmeirion, the setting for the 1960s TV series The Prisoner. He also owns a manor house near the medieval Cooling Castle in Kent.

He appeared on the cover of Railway Modeller magazine in January 2019. In the attic of his house, Holland has spent ten years building a  model railway. It is full of miniature buildings and landscapes that stretch from Berlin to London. He started with photographs and paintings from early 1960s London. According to The Daily Telegraph, "In the evenings, he builds some trains and buildings before switching on some music, pouring a glass of wine and switching on the trains to watch them move around the room."

He received an OBE in 2003 in the Queen's Birthday Honours list, for services to the British music industry as a television presenter and musician. In September 2006, Holland was appointed a Deputy Lieutenant for Kent. Holland was appointed an honorary fellow of Canterbury Christ Church University at a ceremony held at Canterbury Cathedral on 30 January 2009. On 1 February 2011 he was appointed honorary colonel of 101 (City of London) Engineer Regiment.

In June 2006, Holland performed in Southend for HIV/AIDS charity Mildmay, and in early 2007 he performed at Wells and Rochester Cathedrals to raise money for maintaining cathedral buildings. He is also patron of Drake Music.

A fan of the 1960s TV series The Prisoner, in 1987 Holland demonstrated his love of the series and starred in a spoof documentary, The Laughing Prisoner, with Stephen Fry, Terence Alexander and Hugh Laurie. Much of it was shot on location in Portmeirion, with archive footage of Patrick McGoohan, and featuring musical numbers from Siouxsie and the Banshees, Magnum and XTC. Holland performed a number towards the end of the programme.

Holland was an interviewer for The Beatles Anthology TV project, and appeared in the 1997 film Spiceworld as a musical director.

In 2009, Holland commissioned TV series Bangla Bangers (Chop Shop) to create a replica of the Rover JET1 for personal use. Holland has previously owned cats.

in 2018, Holland became the President of the British Watch & Clock Makers Guild.

Writing
His 2007 autobiography, Barefaced Lies and Boogie-Woogie Boasts, was BBC Radio 4 "Book of the Week" in the week beginning 8 October 2007 and was read by Holland.

Discography

Albums which charted and received certifications

Releases

Film and television

Current television programmes
 1992–present Later... with Jools Holland
 1993–present Hootenanny
2020–present Celebrity Gogglebox with Vic Reeves

Books
 "Rolling Stones": A Life on the Road (with Dora Loewenstein), Viking/Allen Lane (1998)
 Beat Route: Journeys Through Six Counties, Weidenfeld & Nicolson (1998)
 Ray Charles: Man and Music,  (with Michael Lydon), Payback Press (1999)
 Hand That Changed Its Mind,   International Music Publications (2007)
 Barefaced Lies and Boogie-woogie Boasts, Penguin Books (2007)

References

External links

Jools Holland (BBC Radio 2)
Later...with Jools Holland (BBC Two)

1958 births
Living people
20th-century British pianists
21st-century British pianists
BBC Radio 2 presenters
BBC television presenters
Boogie-woogie pianists
British male pianists
Deputy Lieutenants of Kent
East West Records artists
English bandleaders
English new wave musicians
English people of Irish descent
English rock pianists
English television presenters
I.R.S. Records artists
Jools Holland's Rhythm and Blues Orchestra members
Officers of the Order of the British Empire
People from Blackheath, London
Squeeze (band) members
Television personalities from London